Tiliacea sulphurago is a species of moth belonging to the family Noctuidae.

It is native to Southern Europe.

References

Noctuidae
Moths described in 1775